Bethany Kate Shriever  (born 19 April 1999) is an elite British cyclist, competing as a BMX racer. A World Junior champion in 2017, and winner of the UCI BMX Supercross World Cup final event in Zolder in 2018, in 2021 Shriever won both the Olympic and World titles, equalling the feat of Colombian legend Mariana Pajón, who won Olympic silver. In 2022 Shriever completed the full set of gold medals by winning the 2022 UEC BMX Racing European Championships; in doing so, she became the first BMX racing cyclist in history to hold all three titles simultaneously.

Life
Shriever was born in 1999 and she began BMX when she was aged eight years old. Thereafter she started training at her local club in Braintree and went on to start competing at weekends. Shriever won the silver medal at the 2016 BMX European Cycling Championships In 2017 she became the Junior World Champion. In 2018 she finished 17th in her maiden appearance as a senior at the World Championships in Baku as well as winning the UCI BMX World Cup final in Belgium edging Judy Baauw and Laura Smulders into second and third. In March 2020 Shriever dominated the  National BMX Series in Manchester without dropping a lap.

Shriever was chosen to be part of Great Britain’s 26 strong cycling squad at the postponed 2020 Tokyo Olympics where she won the Women's BMX racing gold medal. Whilst being interviewed on TV after her win she couldn't refrain from swearing in her shock.

Personal life
Shriever worked  part-time as a teaching assistant in a nursery at the Stephen Perse Foundation to cover some of her costs of training and travelling because UK Sport stipulated in its funding review after the 2016 Rio de Janeiro Olympic Games that only male riders would be supported heading towards Tokyo 2020.

Shriever was appointed Member of the Order of the British Empire (MBE) in the 2022 New Year Honours for services to BMX racing.

Major results
2016
 2nd  European BMX Championships

2017
 1st  UCI BMX World Championships, Junior

2018
 1st  Stage 5, BMX Supercross World Cup, Zolder

2021
 1st  BMX racing, Olympic Games
 1st  UCI BMX World Championships, Elite

2022
 1st  European BMX Championships

References

External links
 
 
 
 
 

1999 births
Living people
BMX riders
English female cyclists
English track cyclists
English Olympic medallists
Olympic cyclists of Great Britain
Olympic gold medallists for Great Britain
Olympic medalists in cycling
Cyclists at the 2020 Summer Olympics
Medalists at the 2020 Summer Olympics
Members of the Order of the British Empire
Cyclists from Greater London
UCI BMX World Champions (elite women)